The S35 is a regional railway line of the Zürich S-Bahn on the ZVV (Zürich transportation network), in the cantons of Zürich, Thurgau and St. Gallen.

Route 
 

The line runs from Winterthur, in the canton of Zürich, to Wil, in the canton of St. Gallen, via the canton of Thurgau. For most of its route, it uses the Swiss Federal Railway's Wil–Winterthur line.

Stations
 Winterthur Hauptbahnhof
 Winterthur Grüze
 Winterthur Hegi
 Räterschen
 Schottikon
 Elgg
 Aadorf
 Guntershausen
 Eschlikon
 Sirnach
 Wil SG

Rolling stock 
All services are operated by the THURBO railway company, using their Stadler GTW trains.

See also 

 Rail transport in Switzerland
 Trams in Zürich

References 

 ZVV official website: Routes & zones

Zürich S-Bahn lines
Transport in the canton of St. Gallen
Transport in the canton of Zürich
Transport in Thurgau